Subhash Bhende (Devanagari: सुभाष भेंडे) is a Marathi writer from Goa, India. He died in December, 2010.

Humor characterizes many of Bhende's writings.

He presided over Marathi Sahitya Sammelan held at Karad in 2003.

The following is a list of Bhende's books:

 Sāhitya-sãskr̥tī (Śrīvidyā Prakāśana, 1999)
 Kinārā (Mêjesṭika Prakāśana, 1994)
 Pitaḷī daravājā (Śrīvidyā Prakāśana, 1993)
 Nivaḍaka gambhīra āṇi gamatīdāra (Mêjesṭika Prakāśana, 1990)
 Jethe jāto tethe (Śrīvidyā Prakāśana, 1990)
 Uddhvasta (Menakā Prakāśana, 1985)
 Drāksha āṇi rudrāksha (Śrīvidyā Prakāśana, 1983)
 Eka ḍoḷe, sāta gāḷe (Sana Pablikeśansa, 1982)
 Mārga sukhācā (Mêjesṭika, 1984)
 Pailatīra (Mêjesṭika, 1982)
  Svarga dona boṭã (Rādhā Prakāśana, 1981)
 Lāmbalacaka Kāḷīśāra sāvalī (Viśvamohinī, 1981)
 Nepoliyananantara tumhīca (Mīnala Prakāśana, 1981)
 Andhāravāṭā. (1978)
 Hasavegirī (Bā. Ga. Ḍhavaḷe Prakāśana, 1978)
 Hāsa-parihāsa (Ameya Prakāśana, 1978)
 Phūla nā phulācī pākaḷī. (1975)
 Dilakhulāsa. (1975)
 Smitakathā. (1973)
 Āmace Gõya āmakā jāya. (1970)

External links
 Bhende (Marathi Page)

Marathi-language writers
Writers from Goa
2010 deaths
Year of birth missing
20th-century Indian short story writers
Indian humorists
Presidents of the Akhil Bharatiya Marathi Sahitya Sammelan